Peter Cousens (born 15 May 1932) is a South African-born former English cricketer.  He was a right-handed batsman who bowled slow left-arm orthodox.  He was born in Durban, Natal.

Cousens made his first-class debut for Essex against Lancashire in the 1950 County Championship.  He made 38 further first-class appearances for Essex, the last of which came against Sussex in the 1955 County Championship.  In his 39 first-class appearances for Essex, he took 44 wickets at a bowling average of 38.79, with best figures of 4/63.  A poor batsman, Cousens scored just 72 runs at a batting average of 3.00, with a high score of 13.  An infrequent feature in the Essex side of the early 1950s, Cousens left the county at the end of the 1955 season.

References

External links
Peter Cousens at ESPNcricinfo
Peter Cousens at CricketArchive

1932 births
Living people
Cricketers from Durban
English sportspeople of South African descent
English cricketers
Essex cricketers